The 2007 Edmonton Eskimos season, saw the team finish 4th in the West Division with a 5–12–1 record and fail to make the playoffs. It marked the first time since 1962–65 that the team missed the playoffs in consecutive years.

Offseason

CFL Draft

Transactions

*Later traded to the Hamilton Tiger-Cats
**Later traded to the Saskatchewan Roughriders

Preseason

Schedule

Regular season

Season standings

Season schedule

Total attendance: 331,591
Average attendance: 36,843 (61.3%)

Player stats

Passing

Rushing

Receiving

Awards and records
None

All-Star selections
None

References

Edmonton Eskimos
Edmonton Elks seasons